Macleay was an electoral district of the Legislative Assembly in the Australian state of New South Wales established in 1880 in the Macleay River area. Between 1889 and 1894, it elected two members with voters casting two votes and the two leading candidates being elected. In 1894, it was abolished, partly replaced by Raleigh. Under the spelling conventions of the time it was generally spelled M'Leay.

Members for Macleay

Election results

Notes

References

Former electoral districts of New South Wales
Constituencies established in 1880
1880 establishments in Australia
Constituencies disestablished in 1894
1894 disestablishments in Australia